Trond Inge Haugland (born 23 March 1976) is a retired Norwegian football defender.

A player for lowly IL Trio since 1993, Haugland dreamt about a football venture abroad. He was scouted by one Terje Simonsen and joined FC Flora Tallinn. After one and a half season in Estonia, he went on to Greek Ionikos. During his four years there, he played in the Alpha Ethniki, the 1999–2000 UEFA Cup and lost the 1999–2000 Greek Cup final.

In the summer of 2003 Haugland moved home to join Norwegian first-tier club Vålerenga. Playing only one league game, he moved elsewhere and played the 2004 season in Pors. From 2005 to 2013 he rounded off his career in IL Trio.

References

1976 births
Living people
People from Kvinnherad
Norwegian footballers
FC Flora players
Ionikos F.C. players
Vålerenga Fotball players
Pors Grenland players
Meistriliiga players
Super League Greece players
Eliteserien players
Norwegian First Division players
Association football defenders
Norwegian expatriate footballers
Expatriate footballers in Estonia
Norwegian expatriate sportspeople in Estonia
Expatriate footballers in Greece
Norwegian expatriate sportspeople in Greece
Sportspeople from Vestland